Yangsan Metro (also known as Busan Metro Yangsan Line) is an under construction rubber-tyred metro line connecting Nopo station in Nopo-dong, Geumjeong District, Busan and Bukjeong station in Bukjeong-dong, Yangsan, South Gyeongsang Province, South Korea. Originally, it was promoted as the Nopo-Bukjeong line.

It includes the project to extend the Busan Metro Line 2 to Yangsan Sports Complex station, and the line will connect the northern termini of Line 1 and Line 2.

Rolling stock
The line will use similar K-AGT driverless trains used on Busan Metro Line 4. The vehicle depot will be built in Seoksan-ri, Dong-myeon, Yangsan.

List of stations

See also
 Busan Metro
 Transportation in South Korea

References

Y
Light rail in South Korea